Volken is a municipality in the district of Andelfingen in the canton of Zürich in Switzerland.

Geography

Of this area, 64.2% is used for agricultural purposes, while 29.1% is forested. The rest of the land, (6.7%) is settled.

Demographics
, 6.8% of the population was made up of foreign nationals. Over the last 10 years the population has grown at a rate of 15%. Most of the population speaks German  (93.7%), with Albanian being second most common ( 3.7%) and Portuguese being third ( 0.7%).

In the 2007 election the most popular party was the SVP which received 60.5% of the vote.  The next three most popular parties were the FDP (12.4%), the CSP (11.2%) and the SPS (9.1%).

The age distribution of the population is children and teenagers (0–19 years old) make up 28.7% of the population, while adults (20–64 years old) make up 59.3% and seniors (over 64 years old) make up 11.9%.  In Volken about 90.5% of the population (between age 25-64) have completed either non-mandatory upper secondary education or additional higher education (either university or a Fachhochschule).

Volken has an unemployment rate of 0.21%.  , there were 46 people employed in the primary economic sector and about 18 businesses involved in this sector.  4 people are employed in the secondary sector and there are 1 businesses in this sector.  22 people are employed in the tertiary sector, with 7 businesses in this sector.

References

External links

 Official website 

Municipalities of the canton of Zürich